Tram Kak District is a district located in Takeo Province, in southern Cambodia. According to the 1998 census of Cambodia, it had a population of 144,032.

Administration
As of 2019, Tram Kak District has 15 communes, 244 villages.

References

 
Districts of Takéo province